Isthme (French: Halte de L'Isthme) is a railway halt in Saint-Pierre-Quiberon, Morbihan department of Brittany, France. The halt is situated within close proximity of the Fort of Penthièvre. It is located at kilometric point (KP) 605.000 on the Auray–Quiberon railway. The halt is served by TER Bretagne services operated by the SNCF, between Auray and Quiberon (summer only).

References

External links
 Auray-Quiberon timetable

TER Bretagne
Railway stations in France opened in 1985
Railway stations in Morbihan